Tris may refer to:

Chemicals
Tris(hydroxymethyl) aminomethane, a biochemical buffer
Tris(2-chloroethyl) phosphate, a flame retardant
Tris(2,3-dibromopropyl) phosphate, a flame retardant

People
Tris Speaker, a baseball player
Tris Prior, a character in the Divergent book series and its film adaptations

Other uses
TRIS online, a former bibliographic database created by U.S. Department of Transportation Research Information Services online